Benjamin Bosworth Smith (June 13, 1794 – May 31, 1884) was an American Protestant Episcopal bishop, and the Presiding Bishop of his Church beginning in 1868.

Early life
Smith was born at Bristol, R. I., and lost his father when he was 5 years old. Nonetheless, he graduated at Brown University in 1816.

Career
The following year he was ordained, beginning his ministry at Marblehead, Mass.  He held several pastoral charges and was for a time editor of the Episcopal Recorder at Philadelphia.  His last rectorship, in Lexington, Ky., he held until 1837, though in 1832 he had become Bishop of the diocese.  While he was presiding Bishop (from 1868), a separatist movement, which became the Reformed Episcopal Church, was organized under the leadership of Bishop Smith's own assistant bishop, George David Cummins.  He published Saturday Evening (1876) and Apostolic Succession (1877).

In the late 1860s, he helped establish schools and hire teachers to work with former slaves throughout the south.

In 1874, Presiding Bishop Smith led the consecration of James Theodore Holly, the first African-American to be consecrated a bishop in the Protestant Episcopal church, and who became the missionary bishop for Haiti.

Architecture
Smith is not to be confused with Benjamin Bosworth Smith (architect) (1863–1926), a related but different architect based in Montgomery, Alabama.

Smith is listed as the architect of several buildings, including some listed on the U.S. National Register of Historic Places:
Church of the Advent, Episcopal (1855), 122 N. Walnut St. Cynthiana, KY, Gothic Revival in style (Smith, Bishop Benjamin Bosworth)
St. Paul's Episcopal Church (1859–60), 338 Center St. Henderson, KY (Smith, Bishop Benjamin Bosworth)  a "chaste" example of Gothic Revival style applied to churches
St. Philip's Episcopal Church (1860–61), Short and Chiles Sts. Harrodsburg, KY (Smith, Bishop Benjamin Bosworth)
Holy Trinity Episcopal Church (1864–68), Georgetown, Kentucky (Smith, Bishop Benjamin Bosworth)

Memorials/legacies

Smith's home at 2833 Tremont Ave. in Highlands, Kentucky or Highlands, Louisville, or Louisville, Kentucky was considered for landmarking but was approved for demolition in 2017. A Gothic-style small study with a peaked roof that Smith used at his Louisville home is preserved on the grounds of the St. Francis in the Fields Episcopal Church ("near Prospect" in Louisville, Kentucky?).

See also
 List of presiding bishops of the Episcopal Church in the United States of America
 List of Episcopal bishops of the United States
 Historical list of the Episcopal bishops of the United States

References

Sources
 This article incorporates text from a publication now in the public domain: Gilman, D. C.; Peck, H. T.; Colby, F. M., eds. (1905). New International Encyclopedia (1st ed.). New York: Dodd, Mead.

External links
 Documents by and about B.B. Smith from Project Canterbury
 The Life and Ministry of Benjamin Bosworth Smith, First Bishop of Kentucky: A Memorial Discourse delivered before the Fifty-sixth Annual Council of the Diocese of Kentucky, on the 24th Day of September, A.D., 1884, in Christ Church, Louisville, by Alfred Lee (1884)

American religious writers
Brown University alumni
1784 births
1884 deaths
Presiding Bishops of the Episcopal Church in the United States of America
People from Bristol, Rhode Island
19th-century Anglican bishops in the United States
People from Marblehead, Massachusetts
Episcopal bishops of Kentucky
18th-century Anglican theologians
19th-century Anglican theologians